SAF, S.A.F or saf might refer to:

Companies 
 SAF Tehnika, a producer of digital microwave data transmission equipment
 Strip Art Features, a comic book publishing house
 Svenska Automobilfabriken, a Swedish auto manufacturer

Computing 
 Service Availability Forum, (SAF or SA Forum), highly available systems model

 Storage Access Framework

Law enforcement
 Special Action Force, of the Philippine National Police

Locations 
 Santa Fe Regional Airport (IATA code SAF)
 South Africa (country code SAF)

Military 
 Secretary of the Air Force
 Singapore Armed Forces
 Slovenian Armed Forces
 Somali Air Force
 Somali Armed Forces
 Spanish Air Force
 Spanish Armed Forces
 Sudanese Air Force
 Sudanese Armed Forces
 Swedish Air Force
 Swedish Armed Forces
 Soviet Air Force

Organizations 
 Second Amendment Foundation, a US gun rights organization
 Škola Animiranog Filma (ŠAF), a Croatian school of animation
 Société astronomique de France, astronomical society
 Society of American Foresters
 Students for Academic Freedom, hosted by the David Horowitz Freedom Center
 Swedish Employers Association

Other 
System access fee, a Canadian telephone surcharge
Sustainable aviation fuel
Sir Alex Ferguson, a Scottish former football manager
Salfords railway station, a railway station in Surrey, England